This is a list of Poland international footballers – football players who have played for the Poland national football team.

References

 
Association football player non-biographical articles